Richard Lloyd (by 1531 – 25 October 1570), of Marrington, Shropshire, was an English politician.

Lloyd was a Member of Parliament for Montgomery Boroughs in April 1554 and November 1554.

References

1570 deaths
Members of the Parliament of England (pre-1707) for constituencies in Wales
English MPs 1554
English MPs 1554–1555
Year of birth uncertain